Exidiopsis effusa is a species of fungus in the family Auriculariaceae, and the type species of the genus Exidiopsis. It is associated with the formation of hair ice on dead wood.

References

External links

Auriculariales
Fungi described in 1888